Robert O'Donnell may refer to:

Robert O'Donnell (cricketer) (born 1994), New Zealand cricketer
Bob O'Donnell (born 1943), American politician
Robert O'Donnell (1957–1995), paramedic involved in the rescue of Jessica McClure
Bob O'Donnell (footballer) (1870–1940), Australian rules footballer